Supernatural Academy is an American animated fantasy television series that premiered on Peacock on January 20, 2022. It is based on the book series created by Jaymin Eve.

Premise
Mischa Jackson/Lebron is a 16-year-old girl living in the human world with her mom Lienda. Her twin sister Jessa Lebron is a popular girl and Wolf-Shifter living at Supernatural Academy with her father, council leader Jonathon. Having been split up at birth, the twins have no idea of each other's existence. Mischa, in particular, has no idea of the supernatural world—populated by Shifters, Magic-Users, Faeries, Trolls, Harpies, Vampires and Mermaids—and lives as a normal teenager in modern-day New York City.

Mischa has visions of wolves, dragons and strange doors, which she draws in her notebook. Her suppressed powers are slowly awakening. Deciding that she can no longer hide and protect her daughter in the human world, Lienda reunites Mischa with her sister and father and enrolls her in Supernatural Academy.

Though they have a rocky start, the twins quickly grow to love each other and forge an unbreakable bond. As their sisterhood is tested time and again, Jessa and Mischa will need each other and their friends if they are to stand a chance against the dark forces seeking to resurrect the Dragon King.

Characters

Main
 Larissa Dias as Jessa Lebron
 Gigi Saul Guerrero as Mischa Jackson/Lebron
 Cardi Wong as Braxton
 Vincent Tong as Maximus
 Ali J. Eisner as Jae
 Bethany Brown as Terra

Recurring
 Alessandro Juliani as Jonathon Lebron and Mezzy
 Barbara Kottmeier as Lienda Jackson/Lebron
 Brian Drummond as Archibold Kristov
 Diana Kaarina as Santra and Zadi
 Kathleen Barr as Yufon
 Shannon Chan-Kent as Elda Kristov, Shan, Opal, Carmen

Episodes

Season 1 (2022)

Production

Development
The series was first announced to be in development in October 2019, with an original release target of fall of 2021. Allen Bohbot serves as the executive producer, while the series is directed by Steve Ball. The pilot was written by Gillian Horvath, who is also headwriter for the other episodes. Jody Prouse serves as the animation director. 41 Entertainment is involved with producing the series, and the animation was provided by ICON Creative Studio.

Release 
The series premiered on January 20, 2022, with the first season consisting of 16 half-hour episodes.

In March 2023, Netflix in the United Kingdom and Australia began carrying the show.

There have been no announcements regarding the series' renewal for a new season.

Cast
The voicecast includes Larissa Dias, Gigi Saul Guerrero, Cardi Wong, Vincent Tong, Ali J. Eisner and Bethany Brown, as the main characters.
Additional characters are spoken by, among others, Alessandro Juliani, Barbara Kottmeier, Brian Drummond, Diana Kaarina, Kathleen Barr and Shannon Chan-Kent.

Reception

Critical response
Polygon praised the show for its rich concept of having a magical school-setting, that is not just populated by human characters, but a variety of mythological creatures. They take issue with the show not really establishing who their intended audience is, with the animation being more catered to younger children, but the language and themes of the show being more suited for a young adult audience. They note the intriguing nature of the inner politics in the Supernatural and the Human World, even if the pilot doesn't do the best job establishing the vast world the show is trying to build.
Slant Magazine also notes as a positive aspect, that the show tries to grapple with social issues relevant for young adults of various backgrounds in today's society, especially the fear and prejudice that comes with being an outcast for superfluous reasons, but criticizes that the show deviates from its rich characters and their problems, to a generic race to save the world during the end of the first season. They give Supernatural Academy a 2 out of 4 stars rating.
Common Sense Media gives the show 3 out of 5 stars, criticizing the jerky CGI animation, but praising the good pace of the show and well-rounded characters.

References

External links

2020s American animated television series
2022 American television series debuts
2022 American television series endings
American computer-animated television series
English-language television shows
American animated fantasy television series
Peacock (streaming service) original programming
Teen animated television series
Television series by Universal Television
Television shows based on books